Eric Bogue (born October 4, 1964) is an American politician who served in the South Dakota House of Representatives from the 28A district from 1995 to 1997 and in the South Dakota Senate from the 28th district from 1999 to 2007.

References

1964 births
Living people
Republican Party members of the South Dakota House of Representatives
Republican Party South Dakota state senators
People from Huron, South Dakota